Dendrophilus xavieri is a species of clown beetle in the family Histeridae. It is found in Europe and Northern Asia (excluding China), North America, and Southern Asia.

References

Further reading

 

Histeridae
Articles created by Qbugbot
Beetles described in 1873